Zhao Feiyan (? – September or October 1 BC), formally Empress Xiaocheng (孝成皇后), was an empress during the Han Dynasty. Her husband was Emperor Cheng. She was known in the Chinese popular mindset more for her beauty than for the palace intrigue that she and her sister, the also beautiful Consort Zhao Hede engaged in, but unlike most of the famous beauties in Chinese history (such as the Four Beauties), she was often vilified by her own sisters. She was often compared and contrasted with Yang Guifei, the beautiful concubine of Emperor Xuanzong of Tang, because she was known for her slender build while Yang was known for her full build. This led to the Chinese idiom huanfei yanshou (環肥燕瘦, literally "plump Huan, slender Fei"), which describes the range of the types of beauties. Later, the idiom was also used as a figurative expression on literary styles that can be either verbose or sparse, but were equally effective.

Early life
The actual birth date of Zhao Feiyan is not known but it is assumed to be 45 BC. According to historical accounts, her personal name might be Yi Zhu (宜主). According to historical accounts, she was a daughter of two hereditary servants of imperial princes or princesses. Those accounts also say that when she was born, her parents were so poor that they abandoned her, but they saw that she was still alive after three days, so they took her back in and raised her. After her father died she and her sister were adopted by a housekeeper to a rich family. Their adoptive father's name was Zhao Lin (趙臨) and they took his surname.

When she grew up, she was assigned to the household of Princess Yang'a (陽阿公主), a sister of Emperor Cheng. She became a dancing girl there, and she received the name that she would become known for—Feiyan (literally, flying swallow) because she was so slender and so agile in dance that she was like a flying swallow.

Imperial consort to Cheng
Circa 19 BC, Emperor Cheng was visiting Princess Yang'a when he saw both her and her sister Hede, and he became enamored with them. He had both of them sent to his palace, and they became greatly favored imperial consorts, and they took his affection away from Empress Xu and Consort Ban. In 18 BC, they falsely accused Empress Xu and Consort Ban of witchcraft; Empress Xu was deposed, and while Consort Ban was able to successfully plead her case, she did not wish to return to the same environment and instead became a lady in waiting for Empress Dowager Wang. The Zhao sisters now dominated the palace.

Emperor Cheng wanted to make Feiyan the new empress, but Empress Dowager Wang complained about her low birth and prior occupation as a dance girl. In 16 BC, she finally capitulated to her son's wishes, and in preparation, Emperor Cheng first created Feiyan's father Zhao Lin the Marquess of Chengyang, so that she would no longer be viewed as coming from low birth. On 13 July, she was created empress.

Empress consort

As an empress (first-rate and chief wife), Zhao Feiyan enjoyed the pinnacle of power and wealth inside the palace and the glory and respect outside the palace. But soon, after Feiyan was made empress, she began to lose favor from Emperor Cheng, while her sister Hede had acquired the title of “Zhaoyi” (second in rank; one lower rank than the Empress, which meant “the concubine behind the Empress”), and received the nearly exclusive affection and proximity of Emperor Cheng.  While the sisters initially were jealous of each other, they later reconciled, and continued to dominate the palace together, and both turned the imperial harems into hell, and their actions made Empress Dowager Wang more dissatisfied with them, but Emperor Cheng continued to support both more and more. However, neither of them would produce any children who could serve as imperial heir—something greatly troubling to Emperor Cheng (whose earlier favorites Empress Xu and Consort Ban were also childless, and no other consort of whom was known to have had children). It was alleged that Empress Zhao, with her sister covering for her, often engaged in adulterous acts with men who were known to have fathered many children, in hopes of becoming pregnant.

Empress Zhao and her sister Hede would also be alleged to have been involved in something even more sinister around this period. Based on an investigative report later authored in 6 BC (after Emperor Cheng's death), Emperor Cheng had two sons—one born to Consort Cao in 12 BC and one born to Consort Xu (a relative of the deposed Empress Xu) in 11 BC. However, both of the sons were murdered in their infancy by orders of Consort Zhao Hede, with at least tacit agreement from Emperor Cheng; Consort Cao was forced to commit suicide after her son was murdered. The report further alleged that the Zhao sisters engaged in many tactics, such as forced abortions, assassinations, and poisonings, to make sure that no other concubine would bear an imperial heir.

In 9 BC, still heirless, Emperor Cheng appeared to come to the resolution of making either his younger brother Prince Liu Xing of Zhongshan (中山王劉興) or his nephew Prince Liu Xin of Dingtao his heir. Emperor Cheng became convinced that Prince Xin was more capable, and at the same time, Prince Xin's grandmother Consort Fu was endearing herself to Empress Zhao, her sister Hede, and Emperor Cheng's uncle Wang Gen with lavish gifts, and so the Zhaos and Wang Gen both praised Prince Xin as well. Emperor Cheng made Prince Xin crown prince on 20 March 8 BC.

Empress dowager 
Emperor Cheng died suddenly in April 7 BC, apparently from a stroke (although historians also report the possibility of an overdose of aphrodisiacs given to him by Consort Zhao Hede). Immediately there were many rumors that he had in fact had concubines who bore him sons, but that those sons and their mothers were murdered by Consort Zhao Hede (out of jealousy) and possibly Emperor Cheng himself. Grieving her husband and apparently fearful of appraisals, Consort Zhao Hede killed herself. Crown Prince Xin ascended the throne as Emperor Ai. Because the rumors largely centered around Hede and because of her role in Emperor Ai's becoming Emperor Cheng's heir, Empress Zhao was personally unscathed, and Emperor Ai honored her with the title of empress dowager. However, she would have little or no political influence during the reign of Emperor Ai.

After the investigative report commissioned by Grand Empress Dowager Wang was published in 6 BC, accusing Consort Zhao Hede of the atrocities against the other imperial consorts and their children (and implicitly, although not directly, accusing Empress Dowager Zhao of the same thing), Empress Dowager Zhao's family was exiled, and the marquess titles granted to her brother and her nephew were removed. However, Empress Dowager Zhao herself was spared, particularly because she was on very friendly relations with Emperor Ai's domineering grandmother Consort Fu (who had now insisted on, and receiving, the title of grand empress dowager as well). Some of her relatives, instead of going into exile, were hidden by Grand Empress Dowager Wang's nephew Wang Ren (王仁), but after they were discovered, Wang was punished by being sent back to his march.

Death 
In August 1 BC, Emperor Ai died. In decisive action, Grand Empress Dowager Wang seized power back from Emperor Ai's favorite Dong Xian and made her nephew Wang Mang regent to the succeeding Emperor Ping. Wang Mang, who wanted to extinguish all dissent (and who previously bore a grudge against Emperor Ai for demoting him and extended that grudge to those who supported Emperor Ai) had Empress Dowager Zhao demoted from her position as empress dowager to the title of Empress Xiaocheng. A few months later, she was further demoted to a commoner and ordered to guard her husband's tomb. That day, she committed suicide.

Inclusion in the Lienü zhuan
Her biography was included in the Confucian classic Biographies of Exemplary Women (Lienü Zhuan), compiled by the Han dynasty scholar Liu Xiang. Zhao Feiyan's biography is part of Scroll 9, titled Supplemental Biographies  (新刊續列女傳).

In popular culture 
She is portrayed as one of the antagonists in the 2008 Chinese television series "The Queens" by Tong Liya.
 Zhao is portrayed as one of the characters of the Chinese television series Love Weaves Through a Millennium, played by Niki Yi.

Notes

References
 Book of Han, vol. 97, part 2.
 Zizhi Tongjian, vols. 31, 32, 33, 34, 35.
 

Han dynasty empresses
32 BC births
1 BC deaths
1st-century BC Chinese women
1st-century BC Chinese people
Suicides in the Han dynasty
 Ancient dancers